Four Seasons is an EP by Kaddisfly, released on Sub City Records in 2006 as a preview of their upcoming record, Set Sail the Prairie.  The EP contains one song from each of the four seasons on the full-length record, in addition to a b-side entitled Games.

Track listing
"Games" - 2:53
"Campfire" - 4:43
"Empire" - 4:25
"Silkroad" - 5:27
"Mercury" - 5:07

2006 EPs